The 1964 Liga Femenina de Baloncesto was the 1st edition of the Spanish premier women's basketball championship. It took place from 23 February to 26 April 1964. Eight teams took part in the championship and CREFF Madrid won the first title. No teams were relegated due an expansion, Medina San Sebastián and Juventud Fantasit were promoted from Segunda División.

First round

Group A

Group B

Finals

Round 1

Round 2

Round 3

External links
Official website
Results

Femenina
Liga Femenina de Baloncesto seasons
Spain